Sabuni's brush-furred rat (Lophuromys sabunii)  is a species of rodent in the family Muridae. It has been recorded from Tanzania.

References

Lophuromys
Mammals described in 2007